Sunil Dutt Dwivedi is an Indian politician and a member of 17th Legislative Assembly, Uttar Pradesh of India. He represents the Farrukhabad constituency in Farrukhabad of Uttar Pradesh.

Political career
Sunil Dutt Dwivedi contested Uttar Pradesh Assembly Election as Bharatiya Janata Party candidate and defeated his close contestant Mohd. Umar Khan from Bahujan Samaj Party with a margin of 45,427 votes.

Posts held

References

People from Farrukhabad
Bharatiya Janata Party politicians from Uttar Pradesh
Living people
Uttar Pradesh MLAs 2017–2022
Year of birth missing (living people)
Uttar Pradesh MLAs 2022–2027